P. purpurea may refer to:
 Pheidole purpurea, an ant species found in Mexico and Central America
 Puccinia purpurea, a plant pathogen species that causes rust on sorghum

See also 
 Purpurea (disambiguation)